Austen Stowell Cargill II (born 1951) is an American billionaire heir, businessman and rancher.

Biography

Early life
Austen Stowell Cargill II was born in 1951. He is the great-grandson of William Wallace Cargill, the founder of Cargill. He earned bachelor's and master's degrees from the University of Minnesota. He went on to earn a doctorate from Oregon State University.

Career
He joined Cargill as a marine biologist and joined its board of directors in 1995. He later served as a vice president until 2001. He was a board member of GalaGen, a NASDAQ-traded company that sold dietary supplements to treat gastrointestinal diseases, from 1999 to 2002 when it went bankrupt.

Personal life
In 2001, he bought the North Ranch in Paradise Valley, Montana, close to Antelope Butte. The ranch was formerly owned by the Church Universal and Triumphant. He goes ruffed grouse hunting in South Dakota. He lives in Livingston, Montana. He is divorced, and has two children.

Bibliography
'The role of lipids as feeding stimulants for shredding aquatic insects' (with Kenneth W. Cummins, Boyd J. Hanson and Robert R. Lowry, in Freshwaster Biology, 29 May 2006)

References

University of Minnesota alumni
Oregon State University alumni
People from Livingston, Montana
Ranchers from Montana
American billionaires
Living people
1950s births